This is a list of Danish television related events from 1975.

Events

Debuts

Television shows

Ending this year

Births
7 July - Adam Duvå Hall, comedian & TV & radio host
3 August - Line Kruse, actress
23 September - Lærke Winther Andersen, actress
6 October - Oliver Bjerrehuus, model & TV host

Deaths

See also
1975 in Denmark